Zvonko Popović (Serbian Cyrillic: Звонко Поповић; born 24 December 1961) is a Serbian football coach and former player.

Since 2000, he has been one of the FK Partizan Academy coaches.

References

External links
 Zvonko Popović at SCO Angers

1961 births
Living people
People from Krupanj
Yugoslav footballers
Serbian footballers
Association football defenders
Serbian football managers
FK Partizan players
FK Partizan non-playing staff
FK Vojvodina players
Angers SCO players
Canet Roussillon FC players
Yugoslav First League players
Ligue 2 players
Serbian expatriate footballers
Expatriate footballers in France